Instituto Regional Federico Errázuriz is a primary and secondary school in Santa Cruz, Chile.
IRFE - French fashion house from the beginning of the 20th century.